Edward Lennox Mortimer (24 April 1886 – 2 November 1962) was an Australian rules footballer who played with South Melbourne in the VFL.

He was recruited from Williamstown, where he played 31 games and kicked 67 goals in 1904 and 1905. A full forward, he was the leading goalkicker in the 1905 Victorian Football Association with a total of 48, and became the first Williamstown player to ever head the Association goal scoring list. In his first seven seasons in the VFL he topped South Melbourne's goalkicking charts and was a member of the club's inaugural premiership side in 1909.

In 1916 he was appointed as coach of Yarraville, then in the Victorian Junior Football Association.

References

External links

Len Mortimer's playing statistics from The VFA Project

1886 births
Australian rules footballers from Melbourne
Australian Rules footballers: place kick exponents
Sydney Swans players
Sydney Swans Premiership players
Williamstown Football Club players
1962 deaths
One-time VFL/AFL Premiership players
People from Footscray, Victoria